The Benelux Chamber of Commerce (BenCham) is a Benelux non-profit organisation representing the interests of Benelux (Belgium, Netherlands and Luxembourg) companies in China. BenCham strives to strengthen business, government and community ties between Benelux organisations and individuals in China.
The Benelux Chamber of Commerce’s main objective is to facilitate networking between its members, the Benelux Embassies and Chinese interest groups.  They oversee a network of Benelux companies and professionals, helping them exchange views and experiences regarding doing business in China.

Organisation

Benelux-China
The Benelux Chamber of Commerce - BenCham - is the most active business platform in China.  Its members, leading companies from Belgium, the Netherlands and Luxembourg, share an active interest in developing trade and business in China. It is the only Chamber of Commerce that is officially recognised and supported by the Embassy of the Kingdom of Belgium, the Embassy of the Kingdom of the Netherlands and the Embassy of the Grand Duchy of Luxembourg in China.

BenCham has been growing at a steady pace since it was established in 2001.  It currently contains 3 chapters; one in Beijing, one in Shanghai and one in Guangzhou (Pearl River Delta).  It is the prime platform for the Benelux business community to get together.

BenCham currently has over 320 members, aspiring to grow further every day.  Its base consists of Large Enterprises, Small and Medium sized Enterprises (SMEs) as well as individuals with an active interest in developing their business in China. As an independent, non-profit organisation, BenCham is managed by a full-time secretariat of both Benelux and Chinese staff.  All practises are guided by an active Board of Directors.  BenCham sustains itself through membership subscriptions, sponsorships and event fees.

On May 27, 2010, BenCham received the Accreditation Certificate from the BLCCA (Accreditation Programme for Belgian and Belgian-Luxembourg Chambers of Commerce Abroad)

History
The Benelux Chamber of Commerce originated in Shanghai in 2001.  The Benelux Business Association (BBA), as they were called then, was established through the merger of the Dutch Business Association and the Belgian-Luxembourg Business Association.  In 2005, the Beijing chapter was created. In March 2006 the BBA changed its name to the Benelux Chamber of Commerce in China (BenCham).
Recently, BenCham expanded its presence in China by founding a third chapter in Guangzhou, representing the flourishing business in the Pearl River Delta (PRD).

Mission
'BenCham strives to strengthen business, government and community ties between Benelux organisations and individuals in China.'
The Benelux Chamber of Commerce’s main objective is to facilitate networking between their members, the Benelux Embassies and other interest groups.  BenCham oversees a network of Benelux companies and professionals, helping them exchange views and experiences regarding doing business in China.  BenCham obtains this goal through the organisation of events.

Members
BenCham has been growing at a steady pace since it was established in 2001. BenCham currently has over 320 members, aspiring to grow further every day.  BenCham’ base consists of Large Enterprises, Small and Medium sized Enterprises (SMEs) as well as individuals with an active interest in developing their business in China.
Companies or individuals can become a Member of BenCham if they can indicate the following:
The individual is a citizen from Belgium, The Netherlands, or Luxemburg.
The company has an office in one of the three Benelux countries.
The individual or the company has a strong affiliation with one or all of the Benelux Countries.
The individual has studied in one of the three Benelux countries.
The individual has close family in or originating from the three Benelux countries.

Events
The key purpose of BenCham China is to extend the business knowledge and network of their members.  In order to do so, they organise a range of events and activities throughout the year both for members and non-members.
BenCham is targeting different groups to reach as many people as possible. 
Business Events: Targeting business people, handling current topics and practical issues in China.  The events are organised in various forms as seminars, conferences, round tables, workshops, panels, etc.
SME Events: Business seminars organised especially to address the difficulties of Small Medium Enterprises in China.
Young Professionals: Seminars that focuses on the needs of young professionals in China.
Networking Events: Events to bring business people together.

Projects
BenCham is also an important partner in several projects. China is a country that experiences both the positive side and the downside of economic growth. The CSR concept is gaining importance in China. This is why BenCham established the Corporate Social Responsibility Platform in corporation with the Embassy of the Kingdom of the Netherlands in Beijing. The main objectives of this platform are knowledge sharing about CSR and to create a joint CSR agenda between Benelux companies in China and other stakeholders in CSR.

The Eco-friendly Pro-Poor Bamboo project another BenCham project is part of the European Commission’s Switch Asia Project. The goal of this program is to promote the usage of sustainable grown bamboo as an alternative for non renewable materials in the industrial sector. 
The Understanding China project, which is sponsored by the European Commission as well aims to inform European Business men and women about their possibilities in China, but also informs them about the possible challenges of doing business in China. It’s all about creating business and dialogue.

Other activities
Members get a listing of their organisation in the BenCham Business Directory. Corporate Members are listed in the Business Directory with their company description and contact details of main and associate representatives. Individual Members are listed with their name and contact details, company name and title.
BenCham provides their members with a monthly newsletter.
The website of BenCham is a valuable tool for its members and people interested in the Benelux business community in China.

References

External links
飞利浦倾情参与“BenCham goes Green!”主题年会
Bencham
BENCHAM presents: Sustainable Corporate Development in China: Research and Practice

Benelux
Chambers of commerce